Luciano Pedro Mendes de Almeida (5 October 1930 – 27 August 2006) was a Brazilian Roman Catholic prelate and professed member from the Jesuits who served as the Archbishop of Mariana from 1988 until his death. He was a noted pastor passionate about the defence of human rights and for the participation of the faithful in ecclesial affairs; he oversaw the establishment of retirement homes and facilities for disabled people during his tenure as archbishop.

In 2011 calls were made for his cause for beatification to be introduced and the national episcopal conference made a formal application to officials in Rome to commence the cause. The start to the cause saw the late archbishop titled as a Servant of God.

Life
Luciani Pedro Mendes de Almeida was born in Rio de Janeiro on 5 October 1930 as one of seven children to Count Cândido Mendes de Almeida (a journalist; 1895-1962) and Emilia de Mello Vieira (d. 1973). His parents married in 1925 and he was named "Luciano Pedro" after his maternal uncle of that name who died in a plane crash during World War I. His siblings were:
 Cândido Antonio (b. 3 June 1928; writer and political scientist)
 Elisa Maria José (d. 2 March 2006)
 Luiz Fernando
 João Theotonio
 Antonio Luiz de Mello
 Maria da Gloria Greve
He received his First Communion on 8 September 1937. His mother died in 1973 from a brain tumor following three unsuccessful operations.

His initial schooling was spent at the Colégio Santo Inácio in Rio de Janeiro. He entered the Jesuits on 2 March 1947 and then underwent his ecclesial studies first at Nova Friburgo from 1951 to 1953 (at the Colégio Anchieta) and then at the Pontifical Gregorian from 1955 until 1959 for his theological studies. His philosophical course at the Gregorian spanned from 1960 to 1965 and he earned his doctorate in Thomism. He received his ordination to the priesthood in Rome before making his solemn profession as a Jesuit on 15 August 1964. He mastered Latin and Italian during his studies as well as English while also learning Spanish and German.

Mendes de Almeida served after his ordination as a professor in the philosophical department in a school back in Brazil from 1965 until 1972. He served in various capacities in the Brazilian Episcopal Conference and the Latin American Episcopal Conference. He was a vocal advocate for human rights and democratic freedom while serving in the two conferences. He offered his support to the embattled Bishop Pedro Casaldaliga after the bishop had been summoned to Rome to be interviewed about his association with Leonardo Boff and his leftist views as the Vatican perceived them. Mendes de Almeida was present in 1980 at the funeral of the slain archbishop Óscar Romero.

In 1988 he was appointed as the newest Archbishop of Mariana. He prioritized himself on greater investment in the media including the creation of the Archdiocesan Department of Communication while also dedicating himself to the greater formation and participation of the faithful. He likewise sought the multiplication of retirement homes and facilities for disabled people. It had been rumored prior to his appointment that he would become the next Archbishop of São Salvador de Bahia but was sent to Mariana instead. But he was calm at his appointment and said that "I am at peace" even though some considered his move to Mariana instead of São Salvador da Bahia was a lack of papal consideration on the part of Pope John Paul II. Mendes de Almeida served as a member of the Pontifical Council for Justice and Peace and worked alongside its head Cardinal Văn Thuận with the prelate later expressing thanks for having had the "great grace to have met him".

The archbishop offered his resignation to Pope Benedict XVI on the eve of turning 75 but the pope turned the offer down and asked that he continue in his position.

He died from liver cancer following complications with Hepatitis C on 27 August 2006 at 6:15pm at the Hospital das Clínicas da Universidade de São Paulo; his final words were: "God is good". He had suffered from this since 2001 (he had an operation in December 2004) and had been hospitalized since 17 July. The earlier death of his sister from Alzheimer's disease aggravated his condition. Upon admittance his condition worsened on 26 July and he was moved to the intensive care unit.

His remains were flown out to Belo Horizonte and then transported via vehicle to Mariana for the funeral which Cardinal Cláudio Hummes presided over.

Beatification process
On 4 May 2011 his successor in Mariana requested that the national episcopal conference consider lodging an official petition to the Congregation for the Causes of Saints to initiate the cause for beatification for the late archbishop; the conference announced in June the formal application would be made that August. The transfer of the forum for the local investigation of the process was made on 5 November 2011 from São Paulo (where he died) to Mariana.

The C.C.S. approved the application and issued the edict declaring "nihil obstat" (no objections) while titling the late prelate as a Servant of God on 13 May 2014. The diocesan phase of investigation opened on 27 August 2014 in Mariana and concluded on 15 June 2018.

References

External links
 Catholic Hierarchy 
 Hagiography Circle

1930 births
2006 deaths
21st-century Roman Catholic archbishops in Brazil
20th-century Roman Catholic archbishops in Brazil
21st-century venerated Christians
Bishops appointed by Pope Paul VI
Bishops appointed by Pope John Paul II
Deaths from cancer in São Paulo (state)
Deaths from liver cancer
20th-century Brazilian Jesuits
Brazilian Servants of God
Jesuit archbishops
Roman Catholic archbishops of Mariana